Vinciguerria mabahiss is a species of fish in the family Phosichthyidae. It is endemic to the Red Sea.

References

Vinciguerria
Fish of the Red Sea
Fish described in 1984